Juvisy is a railway station in Juvisy-sur-Orge, Essonne, Île-de-France, France. The station was opened in 1840 and is on the Paris–Bordeaux railway, Villeneuve-Saint-Georges-Montargis railway and Grande Ceinture line, a freight railway around Paris. The station is served by Paris' express suburban rail system, the RER Line C and RER Line D. The train services are operated by SNCF. A TGV high-speed service also serves the station. During a survey in 2015, the station served 33,426,629 passengers in that year.

From 2014 to 2019, the station received 97 million euros for restructuring works and to create an intermodal hub to facilitate transport changes in the station between the train lines and the 28 bus lines for their 70,000 travelers every day.

In 2018, according to SNCF estimates, the station's annual attendance was 41,423,348, placing it as the seventh station in France in terms of number of passengers, and the number one station in France outside of intramural Paris; it is notably ahead of the Paris-Est and Lyon-Part-Dieu stations.

Train services
The following services serve the station:

High speed service (TGV) Lille–Aeroport CDG–Orleans–Limoges–Brive
Local services (RER C) Saint-Martin d'Étampes–Juvisy–Paris–Issy–Versailles-Chantiers–Saint-Quentin-en-Yvelines
Local services (RER C) Dourdan–Juvisy–Paris–Issy–Versailles-Chantiers–Saint-Quentin-en-Yvelines
Local services (RER C) Dourdan–Juvisy–Paris–Ermont Eaubonne–Montigny
Local services (RER C) Brétigny–Juvisy–Paris–Ermont Eaubonne–Montigny
Local services (RER D) Corbeil-Essonnes–Évry–Juvisy–Villeneuve–Paris–Saint-Denis–Goussainville–Orry-la-Ville–Creil
Local services (RER D) Juvisy–Évry–Corbeil–Essonnes–Boutigny–Malsherbes
Local services (RER D) Juvisy–Évry–Corbeil-Essonnes–Melun

References

External links

 
 

Railway stations in Essonne
Réseau Express Régional stations
Railway stations in France opened in 1840